Season 2 of Hell's Kitchen was cast during November 2005, premiered on June 12, 2006 and concluded on August 14, 2006. This was the first season of Hell's Kitchen to start a number of contestants divided to two teams by gender, which would become a tradition in subsequent seasons.

Sous chef Heather West won the season. Her prize was the position of executive chef at the Red Rock Resort Spa and Casino in Las Vegas with a salary of $250,000, where she worked as chef at the Terra Rossa Restaurant. Runner-up Virginia Dalbeck had the worst streak of any finalist on the show, being nominated every single time apart from wins and "Best of the Worst" nominations.

Taping for the second season was done in the same building where the first season was taped.

This was the last season of the show to be filmed in 4:3.

Cast
 Head chef and host – Gordon Ramsay
 Sous chefs – Scott Leibfried and Mary-Ann Salcedo
 Maître d'hôtel – Jean-Philippe Susilovic

Contestants
The second season featured the following 12 contestants, who were initially separated onto blue and red teams by gender:

Contestant progress
Each week, the best member from the losing team during the latest service period ("best" as determined by Ramsay) was asked to nominate two of their teammates for elimination; one of these two was sent home by Ramsay.

 *Maribel was supposed to join but couldn't, so Giacomo replaced her.

Episodes

Notes

References

External links

Rachel Brown, "Hell's Kitchen" Suicide: Was Reality TV to Blame? CBS News
Terra Rossa Restaurant

Hell's Kitchen (American TV series)
2006 American television seasons